"There Is No Love Between Us Anymore" is a song by Pop Will Eat Itself released on 7" and 12" vinyl in 1988, as the second single from the 1987 album Box Frenzy. An eight-track CD version featuring a small collection of non-album tracks was released in 1991. It is a mainly instrumental track, and the only lyrics that are not sampled are the title of the song. It samples the songs "When I Fall in Love" by Nat King Cole and "You've Lost That Loving Feeling" by the Righteous Brothers. A sample of Joanna Lumley saying "he loves me, he loves me not" from The New Avengers is prominent throughout the song, and the line would be revisited in Pop Will Eat Itself's 1989 song "Wise Up! Sucker."

The versions found on the single are all different to the album version, but the 7" version that appears on the CD single is the same as the album version but with an added intro sampling Nat King Cole's "When I Fall in Love." The Specially Extended Dance Mix is remixed by UK producer Robert Gordon, who worked closely with the band for a large portion of their career. The B-side, "Picnic in the Sky," is a reworked song originally composed in 1986 in the style distinctive of the band's music of that era. "Hit the Hi-Tech Groove," the B-side on the remix 12", appears in the same version on Box Frenzy. "...On the Razor's Edge..." is a remix of the album track "Grebo Guru", and "Kiss That Girl" is exclusive to the "There Is No Love Between Us Anymore" single (although it later appeared on Box Frenzy reissues).

The release of "There Is No Love Between Us Anymore" showed a marked increase in sales for the band, with the single reaching #66 on the UK singles chart. A music video was recorded featuring shots of a couple's relationship, with only very brief views of the band, consisting of extreme closeups from several angles. It appears on the video album Unspoilt by Progress along with a snippet of the band performing the song live while Graham Crabb was still playing drums for the group.

Track listing

7", Single 
Side One
"There Is No Love Between Us Anymore" 3:39
Side Two
"Picnic in the Sky" 2:48

12" Version 
Side One
 "There Is No Love Between Us Anymore (12" Version)" 5:26
 "Picnic in the Sky" 2:48
Side Two
 "...On the Razor's Edge..." 4:09
 "Kiss That Girl" 1:48

Remix 12" Version
Side One
 "There Is No Love Between Us Anymore (Specially Extended Dance Mix)" 4:42
 "Hit the Hi-Tech Groove (M & K Mix)" 5:07
Side Two
 "There Is No Love Between Us Anymore (12" Version)" 5:26
 "Picnic in the Sky" 2:47

8-Track CD Version 
"There Is No Love Between Us Anymore" 3:38
"Picnic in the Sky" 2:47
"…On the Razor's Edge…" 4:09
"Kiss That Girl" 1:47
"Bubbles" 3:07
"Oh Grebo, I Think I Love You (New Version)" 3:30
"Ugly" 1:35
"Love Missile F1-11" 2:48

References

 http://www.popwilleatitself.co.uk/there-is-no-love-between-us-anymore/#.VadMvfmqrJ0
 http://pweination.com/pwei/

1988 singles
Pop Will Eat Itself songs
1987 songs
Songs written by Graham Crabb